A buckaroo is a cowboy of the Great Basin and California region of the United States, from an Anglicization of the Spanish word vaquero.

Buckaroo or Buckaroos may also refer to:

Music
 The Buckaroos, the backing band for country singer Buck Owens
 "Buckaroo" (instrumental), a 1965 instrumental by Buck Owens and the Buckaroos
 "Buckaroo" (song), a song from the self-titled debut album by country singer Lee Ann Womack

Teams
 Kelowna Buckaroos (1961-1983), a former Tier II Junior "A" ice hockey team from Kelowna, British Columbia, Canada
  Summerland Buckaroos (1983-1988), the name of the team after relocating to Summerland, British Columbia
 Port Coquitlam Buckaroos (1999-2006), an ice hockey team based in Port Coquitlam, British Columbia
 Pendleton Buckaroos (1912-1914), a team in the short-lived professional baseball Western Tri-State League
 Portland Buckaroos, several defunct ice hockey teams which were based in Portland, Oregon
 Buckaroos, the sports teams and mascot of Breckenridge High School, Breckenridge, Texas
 Buckaroos, the sports teams and mascot of Monticello High School in Monticello, Utah
 Buckaroos, the sports teams and mascot of Kaycee School , Kaycee, Wyoming

Other uses
 Buckaroo Banzai (character), in the film The Adventures of Buckaroo Banzai Across the 8th Dimension and the Battletech fictional universe
 Buckaroo: The Winchester Does Not Forgive, a 1968 Italian Spaghetti Western film
 Buckaroo!, a children's game made by the Milton Bradley company
 Temco T-35 Buckaroo, an unsuccessful low-cost 1940s trainer aircraft
 Friendship knot, also known as a buckeroo knot
 Buckaroo Broadcasting, LLC, former license owner of radio station KWNA-FM, serving Winnemucca, Nevada
 Buckaroo (horse), an American Thoroughbred racehorse and leading sire
 Nailbiter (comic) takes place in the fictional town of Buckaroo, Oregon
 Slang term for dollar

See also
 "Bronze Buckaroo", a nickname given to actor and singing movie cowboy Herb Jeffries (1913–2014)